Mannix Flynn (born Gerard Mannix Flynn, 4 May 1957) is an Irish independent politician who has served as a Dublin City Councillor since May 2009.

Aside from his work on Dublin City Council, he is also an author and playwright, having written the novel Nothing To Say in 1983 and the play James X in 2002.

Early life
He was sent to St Joseph's Industrial School in Letterfrack aged eleven for eighteen months. He was subjected to sexual and physical abuse there. He also spent time in Marlborough House Detention Centre, Daingean, County Offaly, St Patrick's Institution and was given 5 years at 15 years of age and sent to Mountjoy Prison.

Career

Crime 
Flynn was sent to prison for two years for an arson attack.

Artist
He published the novel Nothing To Say in 1983.  It was subsequently translated into German, Italian, and Polish. He founded his arts company, Farcry Productions, in 2004, which produces visual art, performance and installation work around taboo issues such as child sexual abuse, violence, and addiction.

In 2004, James X performed by Flynn won the Irish Times Theatre Award.  An earlier version of this play titled ' Talking to the Wall' had previously won the Edinburgh Fringe award.

He appeared in the films Cal and When the Sky Falls, Excalibur and worked as an actor in Scotland, London, Austria, and Dublin for 20 years.

Politician
Flynn was first elected to Dublin City Council in the 2009 local elections as an independent candidate representing the South-East Inner City electoral area. He was re-elected to the revised Pembroke-South Dock electoral area in the 2014 local elections.

He tabled a motion to move the Temple Bar Cultural Trust [State company set up in 1991 as a regeneration agency for Temple Bar] under the direct control of Dublin City Council. The trust was subsequently found to be in breach of corporate governance and accountability in a number of public reports.

He has expressed critical views of the way public money was spent as part of a Grafton Street regeneration project in Dublin.

He supports tougher regulation around the amplification of busking on public streets, which led to his office being vandalised  in February 2015. He has been involved in a number of challenges to cycle lane provision, with a High Court challenge against the Strand Road cycle lane COVID mobility trial  and is a spokesperson for a group opposed to this cycle lane trial. Critics have accused Mannix of consistently voting against policies that would provide more active travel infrastructure and in favour of policies which negatively impact pedestrians and cyclists. His legal challenges to cycling provision have the potential to revert a number of cycle lanes which have been created back to servicing predominantly cars.

In 2015, he resigned from the Dublin City Council Arts SPC over what he perceived as a lack of cohesive overall policy, strategy, and vision.

In 2016, he protested against the Artane Band, due to its association with the Artane Industrial School. The band responded saying it has had no association with the former industrial school. Flynn's peaceful protest, which included him protesting on a window sill in his Dublin City Council office, was criticised by some as "attention seeking" and a "publicity stunt full stop".

In 2019 Flynn was involved in a protest march against plans to open the state's largest homeless shelter in his ward. Protesters marched north bound on Aungier Street blocking traffic and shouting slogans against the Peter McVerry trust for providing the services in conjunction with Dublin City Council. In 2020 Flynn took further legal action against the council, who were working in conjunction with the Peter McVerry Trust, so that he could ensure the homeless facilities would not be built in the area.

He contested the 2011, 2016 and 2020 general elections to Dáil Éireann unsuccessfully. He stood unsuccessfully as an independent candidate at the 2021 Dublin Bay South by-election, getting 879 first-preference votes (3.3%).

Land Without God
A 2019 documentary by Flynn, Land Without God, about the effects of clerical abuse on Flynn and his family, received special mention for the Dublin Human Rights Film Award at the Dublin International Film Festival.

References

External links
 Official website
 

Aosdána members
Irish male film actors
Irish male novelists
Irish male dramatists and playwrights
1957 births
21st-century Irish politicians
Local councillors in Dublin (city)
Independent politicians in Ireland
Living people
20th-century Irish novelists
20th-century Irish male writers
21st-century Irish dramatists and playwrights
21st-century Irish male writers